Noorddijk may refer to:

 Noorddijk, North Holland, Netherlands
 Noorddijk, Groningen, Netherlands

See also 
 Noordijk (disambiguation)